Arbër Bytyqi (born 16 October 2003) is a Kosovo Albanian professional footballer who plays as a right back and central midfielder for Llapi.

Career

Laçi
Born in Prizren, modern-day Kosovo, Bytyqi joined Albanian club Laçi in 2019 where he would initially play for the club's under-17 and under-19 sides. After impressive displays for the club's youth sides, he was called up to the first team by head coach Armando Cungu and was an unused substitute in their 2–1 home loss to Tirana on 22 December 2019. He would go on to make his professional debut on towards the end of the 2019–20 Kategoria Superiore season in a 3–1 home win against Luftëtari on 11 July 2020, coming on as an 83rd-minute substitute for Rudolf Turkaj.

Honours
Tirana
 Kategoria Superiore: 2021–22
 Albanian Supercup: 2022

References

External links

2003 births
Living people
Sportspeople from Prizren
Kosovo Albanians
Kosovan footballers
Albanian footballers
Albania youth international footballers
Association football fullbacks
Association football defenders
Association football midfielders
KF Laçi players
KF Tirana players
Kategoria Superiore players
Kosovan expatriate footballers
Expatriate footballers in Albania
Kosovan expatriates in Albania